Garfield Mountain may refer to:

Garfield Mountain (Montana), a major summit in the Beaverhead Mountains
Garfield Mountain (New York)
Garfield Mountain (Washington)

See also
 Garfield Peak (disambiguation)
 Mount Garfield (disambiguation)